Masooma Junaid Farooqi (born 21 November 1989) is a Pakistani former cricketer who played as a left-arm medium bowler. She appeared in 10 One Day Internationals and six Twenty20 Internationals for Pakistan in 2011 and 2012. She played domestic cricket for Karachi, Pakistan Universities, Zarai Taraqiati Bank Limited and Sindh.

Career

One Day International
Masooma made her One Day International debut against Sri Lanka in Colombo on 21 April 2011.

Twenty20 International
Masooma was selected to play in the 2010 Asian Games in China.

References

External links
 
 

1989 births
Living people
Cricketers from Karachi
Pakistani women cricketers
Pakistan women One Day International cricketers
Pakistan women Twenty20 International cricketers
Karachi women cricketers
Pakistan Universities women cricketers
Zarai Taraqiati Bank Limited women cricketers
Sindh women cricketers
Cricketers at the 2010 Asian Games
Asian Games gold medalists for Pakistan
Asian Games medalists in cricket
Medalists at the 2010 Asian Games